Invisible Republic: Bob Dylan's Basement Tapes (1997) is a book by music critic Greil Marcus (born 1945) about the creation and cultural importance of The Basement Tapes, a series of recordings made by Bob Dylan in 1967 in collaboration with the Hawks, who would subsequently become known as the Band.

The updated paperback edition (2011, Picador) is retitled The Old, Weird America, a term coined by Marcus to describe the often eerie country, blues, and folk music featured on the Anthology of American Folk Music (1927-1932; released 1952). In his opinion, the sensibility of Anthology is reflected by the Basement Tapes recordings. The term has been revived via the musical genre called New Weird America.

Content
Marcus quotes Robbie Robertson’s memories of recording the Basement Tapes: "[Dylan] would pull these songs out of nowhere. We didn't know if he wrote them or if he remembered them. When he sang them, you couldn't tell." Marcus called these songs "palavers with a community of ghosts." He suggests that "these ghosts were not abstractions. As native sons and daughters they were a community. And they were once gathered in a single place: on the Anthology of American Folk Music, a work produced by a 29-year-old of no fixed address named Harry Smith." Marcus argues Dylan's basement songs were a resurrection of the spirit of Anthology, originally published by Folkways Records in 1952, a collection of blues and country songs recorded in the 1920s and 1930s, which proved very influential in the folk revival of the 1950s and 1960s. Anthology, initially titled American Folk Music, was reissued by Smithsonian Folkways as a box set of compact disc in the same year as the book's publication, with portions of the book excerpted as liner notes.

Marcus links the First Great Awakening, the folk music revival of the 1950s, the Civil Rights Movement and the Battle of Matewan in West Virginia with Bob Dylan's 1966 tour with the Hawks.

Notes

Books about Bob Dylan
Books about rock music
1997 non-fiction books
Henry Holt and Company books